Though the French established colonies in India in the 17th century itself, it was not until the end of the 19th century they started civil administration in French India.

French Metropolitan Decree
A French Metropolitan Decree, dated 12 March 1880 adopted a six-year term of office for Mayors (Maire), municipal councillors (Conseil Municipaux) and commune panchayats (Communes). Thus French India has seen a French system of municipal administration.

In the past, municipal administration was virtually the pivot of the whole administrative machinery in French India. It had several features that could serve as a role model for hassle-free administration in French India.

History of Communes from 1880
The whole system was devised on the same pattern as prevailed in France and other French colonies. The Territory was originally divided into ten communes in 1880, namely:

Pondichéry
Pondichéry (Chef-lieu de commune)
Oulgaret
Villenour
Bahour
Karikal
Karikal (Chef-lieu de commune)
Grand'Aldee
Nedoungadu
Chandernagore
Chandernagore (Chef-lieu de commune)
Mahé
Mahé (Chef-lieu de commune)
Yanaon
Yanaon (Chef-lieu de commune)

As the area were found too large for administration, by decree of 24 December 1907 they were re-organized into 17 communes, with effect from 21 February 1908.
Pondichéry
Pondichéry (Chef-lieu de commune)
Ariancoupom
Mudaliarpeth
Oulgaret
Bahour
Nettapacom
Villenour
Tiroubouvane
Karikal
Karaikal (Chef-lieu de commune)
Tirounallar
Nedoungadu
Kottucherry
Grand'Aldee
Neravy
Chandernagore
Chandernagore (Chef-lieu de commune)
Mahé
Mahé (Chef-lieu de commune)
Yanaon
Yanaon (Chef-lieu de commune)

Consequent on the merger of Chandernagore with West Bengal, the number of communes have been reduced to sixteen. These sixteen local areas (communes) were declared as Municipalities and administered by Mayors and the Councils.

Except Pondicherry and Karikal which had 18 and 14 respectively, all other 14 communes had 12 seats each. Thus the total municipal council are 200 in number.

Le chef-lieu de commune (Principal town)
French India had had five principal (Chef-lieu) communes. They are Pondichéry, Chandernagore, Karikal, Mahé and Yanaon.

La Mairie (Hôtel de Ville)
The Mairie (Town Hall) in Pondicherry is called as Hôtel de Ville. It was magnificent and elegant 19th century municipality building situated close to the sea near Beach Road in Pondicherry.

Other municipalities of French India, i.e. Karikal, Mahé and Yanaon also have their respective Mairie halls at their place.

Municipal wards (Sièges)
During French colonial rule, Pondichéry settlement had a total of 102 Sièges. Pondichéry commune had 18 Sièges while other 7 communes had 12 Sièges each. Karikal settlement had 74 Sièges. Chandernagore Municipality had 25 wards, Mahé Municipalité had 12 Sièges and Yanaon Municipalité had 12 Sièges. Then, they were called previously as Sièges instead of wards.

Structure of municipality
Each ward (Siège) was represented by a municipal councilor (Conseiller Municipal). Each commune possessed a Mayor (Maire) and a Municipal council (Conseil Municipal) which managed the commune from the Mairie (city hall). The life-span of a Municipal council was six years, with one half of the membership renewed for every three years.

Timeline of past elections held

1880 30 May
1883
1886
1892
1898
1902
1904
Re-organized into 17 new communes by decree of 25 December 1907 (w.e.f 21 February 1908)
1910
1913
1916
1919
1922
1928 9 May
1931
1934 21 October
1937
1940
1946 23 June
Re-elections held based on Indo-French agreement dated June 1948
1948 24 October (Regarding future of French colonies)
1954 18 October (Regarding merger with India)
de facto transfer to the Republic of India on 1 November 1954
No elections until de jure transfer
1962
1968
2006

List of mayors until 1932
The list of mayors of Pondicherry until 1932 is given below
 Emile Heuquet
 Léon Guerre (1880)
 Armand Gallois-Montbrun
 Gaston Pierre
 Munusamy Naicker - Villenour Commune Mayor(1897-1899) [FROM SANDHAI PUDUKUPPAM]
 Henry Gaebelé (1899)
 Balaponnusamypoullé
 Gaston Pierre (second term)
 Henry Gaebelé (1908-1928)
 Jules Guerre
 Lucien Gallois-Montbrun

First and last mayors of French India
 Pondichéry
First : Emile Heuquet
Last : Muthu Pillai
 Karikal
First : M. Gaudart
Last : V. Govindarajan
Mahé
First : Advocate. Paduvankutty
Last : V.N. Purushothaman
Yanaon
First : Bezawada Bapa Naidou
Last : Madimchetti Satianandam (de jure), Samatam Kistaya (de facto)
Chandernagore
First : Charles Dumaine
Last : Kamal Prosad Ghosh

Most important elections
Elections held on 24 October 1948 and 18 October 1954 are most crucial in the history of French India.

Chandernagore elections

Municipal elections were in August 1948, and were conducted more or less peacefully. The Congress Karma Parishad, an organization sponsored by Bengal members of the Indian Congress Party, won 23 of the 25 seats. The Parishad had stated its policy as one of merger with India.

On 15 December the new Municipal Council passed a resolution in favour of such a merger and requested both the French and Indian Governments to effect the change of administration "in a smooth and amicable manner before March 31, 1949".
Total seats -25
Congress Karma Parishad - 23
Pro-French Group - 02

Election results of 1948

In June 1948 the French and Indian Governments came to an agreement as to how the future of the French Settlements should be determined. Municipal elections were held in Pondichéry, Karikal and Yanam on 24 October 1948. The two main parties were the French India Socialist Party, who favoured the continuance of French rule, and the French India Congress (Congress), who favoured union with India.

Pondichéry - 102
Socialists - 83
Congress - 13
Independents - 09
Karikal - 74
Socialists - 64
Congress - 10
Yanaon - 12
Socialists - 09
Independents - 03
Mahé - 12
Socialists - 12

Election results of 1954

Franco-Indian negotiations were resumed in early August 1954, that time in New Delhi. Nationalist agitation in the settlements was suspended while the negotiations were in progress. A compromise between the French and Indian points of view was worked out. India and France, following talks, issued a joint statement on 13 October 1954 announcing a procedure for deciding the status of the French settlements. Five days later, on 18 October a joint communiqué was issued stating that "all elected members of the Representative Assembly and municipal councils will meet on 18 October at Pondicherry to consider the joint proposals of the two Governments for a final settlement of the future of the establishments and to record their decision on these proposals as an expression of the wishes of the people". This historical meeting is called Kiloor Congress.

The importance of the Congress and the necessity of the members to attend the Congress were expressed in a circular, which was signed by the Secretary General for French India and dispatched to the elected members accompanied by the topographical map of the place where the congress was to be held together with the admission card. There was a proposal to hold the congress at karaikal, but that was set aside. Kizhur, a tiny hamlet was finally chosen in order to avoid the disturbances, which the presence of messrs. Goubert and Mouthoupoulle might have provoked if the congress had been held at Pondicherry. 
Monsieur Balasubramanian, President of Assemblée Représentative, acted as presiding officer of the congress. After considering the draft agreement put before them by the French and Indian Governments the Congress voted in secret ballot. An agreement for the de facto transfer of the Establishments was thereupon signed in Delhi on 21 October 1954.

Total Voters - 178
For India - 170
For France - 8

Date of events

See also
 Pondicherry Municipal Council
 Yanam Municipal Council
 French East India Company
 Coup d'État de Yanaon
 French colonial empire
 French India
 Representative Assembly of French India

References

External links
District homepage of Pondicherry
Official website of the Government of the Union Territory of Puducherry
Indian Ministry for External Affaires - 1956 Treaty of Cession
Future of French India, by Russel H. Fifield (Associate Professor of Political Science at University of Michigan

Notes

Local government in Puducherry
French India
Colonial India
Yanam